Writing to Persuade: How to Bring People Over to Your Side is a 2019 non-fiction book by Trish Hall, a longtime journalist and former op-ed editor at The New York Times.

Overview
The book is "part memoir, part self-help, and part writing guide" according to Kirkus Reviews. Subjects covered in the book include: "why lies on Twitter are more popular than facts," "why Republicans are better persuaders than Democrats," "how things work at Op-Ed," as well as "inside baseball" at The New York Times about "memorable essays" by Angelina Jolie, Vladimir Putin, and others.

Reception
Writing to Persuade received positive reviews. Kirkus Reviews said it is "a lucid book about building bridges through communication along with some interesting behind-the-scenes background at the NYT." Publishers Weekly wrote, "This book offers sound, well-reasoned advice that will benefit any writer." In a review in The New York Times Book Review, Patricia T. O'Conner stated, Hall "convincingly demonstrates that beliefs always outweigh facts."

References

External links
 

2019 non-fiction books
Boni & Liveright books